TV7 Bordeaux is a local television channel in Bordeaux, France.

Television channels and stations established in 2001
Mass media in Bordeaux
Television stations in France